The Scottish Rite Masonic Temple in Los Angeles, California is a monumental building on Wilshire Boulevard which was completed in 1961.  It was designed by Millard Sheets.

The building was purchased by The Maurice and Paul Marciano Art Foundation in July 2013.  It was opened as a contemporary art museum from 2017 to 2019.

It was associated with the Scottish Rite order within Freemasonry.

References

Masonic buildings in California
Buildings and structures completed in 1961